Abdulahi Mohamed Sa'adi was the first president of the Somali regional state of Ethiopia, serving from January to July 1993.

Early life and education 
Sa'adi was born in 1934 in Fik, the main town of the Nogob region in the Ogaden, Ethiopia. At the age of 14 he moved with his family moved to Herar, where he attended a primary school. He attended intermediate and high school in Addis Ababa.

Career 
In early 1956, Sa'adi went to Somalia, where he started his political career. He addressed the United Nations General Assembly in December 1964 about the Ogaden War. In 1964 he emigrated to Kenya, where he started a business. In early 1976, he returned to Somalia to carry on his political career, and he participated in the Ogaden war in 1977.

In 1977, Sa'adi was appointed as representative to Kuwait of the Western Somali Liberation Front. Later, he joined the newly formed Ogaden National Liberation Front. Later, the Somali government  called for his return, but, fearing prosecution, he applied for political asylum at the Swedish embassy in Kuwait, and he then moved to Sweden.

Sa'adi was among the 45 members of the central committee of the liberation front, which was established in 1992. He was elected  president of the newly established state of Somali on January 23, 1993, but he was removed from office in July 1993, succeeded by Hassan Jire Kalinle.

References

External links
 "Federalism and Autonomy Conflicts in the Somali Region," Leyden University, Netherlands
 John Markakis, "The Somali in Ethiopia," Review of African Political Economy, Volume 23, Number 70, December 1996

Living people
1934 births
Presidents of Somali Region
20th-century Ethiopian politicians
People from Somali Region